Tom Jenkins may refer to:
Tom Jenkins (baseball) (1898–1979), American baseball player
Tom Jenkins (golfer) (born 1947), American golfer
Tom Jenkins (teacher) (1797–1859), Britain's first black school teacher
Tom Jenkins (trade unionist) (1920–2012), Welsh trade union leader
Tom Jenkins (wrestler) (1872–1957), American professional wrestler

See also
Tommy Jenkins (born 1947), former English footballer
Tommy Jenkins (Australian footballer) (1902–1979), Australian rules footballer
Thomas Jenkins (disambiguation)